Social Research: An International Quarterly is a quarterly academic journal of the social sciences, published by The New School for Social Research, the graduate social science division of The New School. The journal has been published continuously since 1934. It has featured over 2,000 authors, including Hannah Arendt, Leo Strauss, and Jacques Derrida. It is edited by Arien Mack. The managing editor is Anna Paretskaya. Guest editors are often invited for thematic issues.

Most issues are theme-driven, combining historical analysis, theoretical explanation, and reportage in rigorous and engaging discussion. Articles cover various fields of the social sciences and the humanities and thus promote the interdisciplinary aims that have characterized The New School for Social Research since its inception.

The themes selected are current, often pressing issues in world society. The themes often include a political angle, keeping in the tradition of the New School for Social Research's politically conscious history.

Since 1988, the journal publishes the proceedings of a conference series it organizes. The conferences aim to enhance public understanding of critical and contested issues by exploring them in broad historical and cultural contexts.

External links
Social Research: An International Quarterly – Official webpage
The New School for Social Research – Journals and Publications
Social Research – on Johns Hopkins University Press website

Sociology journals
Publications established in 1934
Quarterly journals
English-language journals